John Dossett (born April 15, 1958) is an American actor and singer.

Early life and education
Dossett attended Mount Pleasant High School in Wilmington, Delaware, from 1972 through 1976, where he was an announcer for the school's radio station, WMPH, and appeared in student theater productions.

Career
Dossett made his Broadway debut in 1979 in a short-lived musical entitled the King of Schnorrers.  In 1982 he joined the cast of Fifth of July, after which the bulk of his work was in off-Broadway productions and on television. He was a member of the off-Broadway Circle Repertory Company, performing in many plays between 1980 and 1994.  A significant screen credit is the 1990 AIDS drama, Longtime Companion.

He later achieved success in two popular musicals, Ragtime (1998) and the 2003 revival of Gypsy as "Herbie" opposite Bernadette Peters. His performance in the latter garnered him both Tony Award and Drama Desk Award nominations as Outstanding Featured Actor in a Musical. He was reunited with his Gypsy co-star Peters in a one-night-only benefit reading of Love Letters in September 2007, for Opening Act.

In 2005, he took over the role of Sam Charmical in Mamma Mia! Dossett appeared in the world premiere of the Michael John LaChiusa and Sybille Pearson musical Giant, as Bawley, at the Signature Theatre in Arlington, Virginia through May 31, 2009. He reprised his role at the Dallas Theater Center production of Giant, from January 18, 2012 through February 19.

He played the role of "Aaron" in the new musical First Wives Club, starting in July 2009 at the Old Globe, San Diego, California. In September 2009, Dossett returned to the Broadway musical Mamma Mia! in the role of Sam Carmichael opposite Tony Award winner Beth Leavel and later Lisa Brescia.

In September 2011, he played the role of Joseph Pulitzer in the premiere of the Disney stage musical Newsies at the Paper Mill Playhouse in Millburn, New Jersey. He had been cast as Frank Crawley in the Broadway production of Rebecca, but left that musical because he appeared in Newsies on Broadway as Joseph Pulitzer. Newsies opened on Broadway on March 15, 2012 in previews. He later joined the Broadway production of Chicago as Billy Flynn for an engagement lasting from March to May 2015.

He played the role of "Larry Murphy" in the Off-Broadway production of Dear Evan Hansen, which opened in previews on March 26, 2016 at the Second Stage Theatre, and closed on May 29, 2016. He appears as "Tommy Lewis" in the musical by Doug Wright (book), Scott Frankel (music) and Michael Korie (lyrics) titled War Paint. The musical, which stars Patti Lupone and Christine Ebersole, premiered at the Goodman Theatre, Chicago, on June 28, 2016. On March 7, 2023, he took over the role of the Wizard in the Broadway production of Wicked.

Personal life
Dossett married actress Michele Pawk on February 14, 2004. The couple met in 1994 while working together in an off-Broadway musical, Hello Again. They worked together in the musical Mamma Mia! in 2005 and also star alongside each other in Wicked beginning in March 2023. The couple resides in South Orange, New Jersey. They have a son, Jack, born in February 2000.

Acting credits

Stage

Television

Film

References

External links
 
 
 Lortel entry

1950s births
20th-century American male actors
21st-century American male actors
American male stage actors
American male television actors
Living people
People from South Orange, New Jersey